TwoSet Violin is a musical comedy duo consisting of Australian violinists Brett Yang and Eddy Chen. The pair is best known for their musical comedy on their YouTube channel, which has reached 4 million subscribers and 1.3 billion views as of February 2023.

History
Brett Yang and Eddy Chen first met each other as young teens in an after-school maths group. They became acquainted as the youngest members of a youth orchestra and later as students at the Queensland Conservatorium Griffith University in Brisbane, Australia. In 2012, Yang debuted at Queensland Conservatorium performing the Tchaikovsky Violin Concerto. He later worked with various other Australian orchestras, including a performance at the 2014 G20 Brisbane summit. Chen was a finalist for the 2014 National Young Virtuoso Award in Queensland, and had played with the Queensland Symphony Orchestra and the Melbourne Symphony Orchestra.

In 2013, the duo started posting covers of pop music played on the violin on a YouTube channel. Yang said that they had viewed violin virtuosos playing covers that had garnered millions of views on YouTube, and attempted to do the same to minimal reaction. Discovering that Taiwanese-Australian violinist Ray Chen made comedic videos, they shifted their content production in a similar direction, focusing their videos on their lives at conservatory, as classical musicians and as students, which led to a dramatic increase in viewership. At the end of 2016, Yang and Chen resigned their places in the Sydney Symphony Orchestra and the Queensland Symphony Orchestra respectively to begin performing live concerts of their own.

The TwoSet Violin YouTube channel received a Silver Play Button in 2018 for surpassing 100 thousand subscribers, and a Gold Play Button in 2019 for surpassing 1 million subscribers. Classic FM's Kyle Macdonald listed TwoSet Violin as one of the "10 ways the 2010s changed classical music forever". In January 2020, it was announced that the duo would be attending that year's Menuhin Competition, held at Richmond, Virginia, as roving reporters; the competition was postponed due to the COVID-19 pandemic. On 8 February 2020, TwoSet Violin live-streamed a performance of the Tchaikovsky Violin Concerto to celebrate their achievement of two million subscribers. Yang played the solo part while Chen performed an original arrangement of the orchestral component for solo violin.

In December 2020, the duo announced a temporary hiatus from YouTube while Yang addressed some health issues, and announced a slow return to making videos in January 2021. In 30 January 2021, to celebrate their achievement of 3 million YouTube subscribers, TwoSet Violin live-streamed another performance, of the Sibelius Violin Concerto, with Chen playing the solo while Yang performed an arrangement of the orchestral component for solo violin. In May 2021, they posted videos to support the Menuhin Competition. On 16 November 2022, to celebrate their upcoming 4 million subscribers achievement, TwoSet Violin live-streamed a performance of Mendelssohn's Violin Concerto in E minor, Op. 64 and Bach Concerto in D minor for Two Violins, BWV 1043 with support by the Singapore Symphony Orchestra at the Victoria Concert Hall. In February 2023, they hosted a music battle at the Star Performing Arts Centre in Singapore with YouTuber bassist Davie504.

Tours

With KickStarter as their fundraising method along with street performance in Sydney, they raised enough money to go on a worldwide tour in 2017 to 11 cities in 10 countries in Asia and Europe, including Taipei, Helsinki, and Frankfurt. In 2018, they performed in several places in the United States including New York City, San Francisco, and Los Angeles.

In October 2019, TwoSet announced another world tour where they planned to visit multiple locations in Oceania, Europe, Asia and North America. However, the tour was postponed as a result of the COVID-19 pandemic, and a virtual world tour event was held instead on 28 December 2021. On 16 November 2022, they announced an upcoming world tour for 2023–24.

Videos and themes 
In 2017, TwoSet Violin made a comedic reference to Ling Ling, a fictional violinist who "practices 40 hours a day". In an interview with Yle Uutiset, they described Ling Ling as the final boss of a video game: the Chuck Norris of violinists. Chen said they improvised the character from their comedy sketch video concerning a teenage violin student's tiger mom comparing the student to her friend's child. In 2018, they released a series of videos called the Ling Ling Workout. In these challenges, the duo play classical pieces (or contemporary music) with handicaps such as playing at double speed, with scordatura, while dancing or hula hooping, with hand positions reversed, or while upside down. Prominent violinists such as Ray Chen, Ziyu He, and Hilary Hahn have also attempted the challenge on their channel.

In July 2018, they released a series of videos in which they performed classical music using rubber chickens. Recurring themes include violin charades, trying out various instruments, and viola jokes.

Another popular video series consists of reviews of film and TV show scenes that feature violin playing, in which Yang and Chen critique egregiously fake performances. On April Fools' Day 2019, they claimed they discovered a new Double Violin Concerto by J.S. Bach.

In September 2018, TwoSet Violin uploaded a reaction video to a BBC News story titled "Fastest Violinist in the World", in which they challenged violinist Ben Lee's Guinness World Record claim of playing "Flight of the Bumblebee" for what they perceived to be significant inaccuracy. They satirically timed themselves purposefully playing random fast notes before declaring they had broken the world record.

Twoset Violin, in addition with their usual content, has also posted music and films mainly composed by themselves and Jordon He. In October of 2020, they released a video titled "Prelude", a short piece composed and played by TwoSet Violin and He. In June 2022, they posted "FANTASIA", a short film written by the duo, that contained several pieces composed by themselves and He, consisting of the previously mentioned 'Prelude', 'Scherzo', 'Adagio', and 'Rhapsody'. The film also includes a guest appearance of Chloe Chua.

Other ventures 
TwoSet has a clothing line called TwoSet Apparel.

References

External links

 

Australian comedy musicians
Australian classical violinists
Australian YouTubers
Singaporean YouTubers
Queensland Conservatorium Griffith University alumni
Musicians from Brisbane
Living people
Australian musical duos
21st-century Australian male musicians
21st-century Australian musicians
Music YouTubers
YouTube channels launched in 2013
21st-century violinists
Comedy YouTubers
Sydney Symphony Orchestra people
Male classical violinists
Year of birth missing (living people)
Humor in classical music